Henik may refer to:

 Henik Lake, lake in Kivalliq Region, Canada
 Avishai Henik (born 1945), Israeli neurocognitive psychologist
 Henik (footballer) (born 1989), Henik Luiz de Andrade, Brazilian footballer